Ahlem Mosteghanemi, alternatively written Ahlam Mosteghanemi (born 1953) is an Algerian writer who has been called "probably the world's best-known Arabophone woman novelist". She was the first Algerian woman to publish fiction in Arabic.

Biography

Birth in exile and return to Algeria
Ahlem was born in Tunis, Tunisia. She is the daughter of a militant political activist who was forced into exile during the Algerian liberation war. In the wake of independence, her family moved back to Algeria, where her father, an intellectual and a humanitarian, occupied high positions in the first Algerian government. He launched a literacy campaign all over the territory and supervised the distribution of agricultural land to the poorest.

Early poetry
In the 70s, following the assassination attempt during the Boumediene coup d’état, and the consequent hospitalization of her father, who was also targeted, Ahlem, as the eldest sibling, took up the responsibility of providing for her family as a radio host. At the age of 17, she became popular in Algeria with the poetic daily show Hammassat (Whispers) on national radio.
While publishing in 1973, Ala Marfa al Ayam (To the Days’ Haven), Ahlem also became the first woman to publish a compilation of poetry in Arabic, which put her on a thorny and untraveled path. It was followed in 1976 by the release of Al Kitaba fi Lahdat Ouray (The Writing in a Moment of Nudity). At the time, she was part of the first generation to acquire the right to study in Arabic after more than a century of prohibition by the French colonization.

The Arabic language
Ahlam studied in the Arab school for girls to open after Algeria's independence, gaining proficiency in Modern Standard Arabic. She has said that 'Arabic was my father’s choice, not mine; he wanted me to avenge him, as he was deprived of learning it by the French colonizer, who declared war on the Arabic language as a way of stripping Algerians of their identity... For my father, choosing Arabic was a conscious political decision, but for me, it was my father’s will that I was keen on fulfilling'.

But, at the time, the Algerian society was rebuilding its identity and recovering from a colonial past that resulted in the death of over a million and a half. It was not prepared to see a girl express herself freely on subjects such as love and women's rights. It was even less prepared to see her do it in the sacred Arabic language. This is where Ahlem's battle begins against sexism. Although women had fought alongside men during the revolution, in the postwar period they were generally relegated to their traditional roles; they were denied the freedom to express themselves and to aspire to success. After she received her B.A in Literature, the board of directors of the University of Algiers refused her enrolment for a Masters under the pretense that her freedom of expression had a negative impact on students. She was also expelled from the Union of Algerian Writers for not conforming to the political line of her time.

Marriage and life in Paris
In Algiers, Mosteghanemi met Georges El Rassi, a Lebanese journalist, who was preparing a thesis about “Arabization and cultural conflicts in independent Algeria”. They were married in 1976 in Paris and settled there. Ahlam pursued her university studies at the Sorbonne, where in 1982 she obtained a doctorate in Sociology. Her thesis explored the misunderstanding and malaise between both sexes in the Algerian society. The doctorate was under the guidance of Jacques Berques, an eminent orientalist, who also wrote the preface of her thesis (published in 1985 by L’Harmattan as Algérie, femmes et écriture).
During the fifteen years she spent in Paris, Ahlam contributed to various magazines, and during time stolen from her new role as a mother of three young boys, wrote fragments of what turned out after four years to be a novel. Ahlam justified her transition from poetry to prose by saying: «When we lose a love, one writes a poem, when we lose our homeland, one writes a novel». Algeria is never far from her mind: «There are countries that we live in and countries that live in us».

Settling in Lebanon and revelation

Once she settled down in 1993, in Lebanon, she presents her novel “Zakirat el Jassad” (Memory of the Flesh), to the editor of the renowned publishing house Dar Al Adab. Excited, the editor will declare: « this is a bomb». It will be the revelation. This novel, written in a style highly poetic and with political bravado, will have a phenomenal success throughout the Arab world. The love story is set between an armless painter and the daughter of his former commander encountered in Paris 25 years after the war. The novel evokes the disappointment of the post-war generation, which echoes the disappointment of a generation of Arabs. In a famous letter to the author, Nizar Kabbani, the great contemporary Arab poet, declared: « This novel gave me vertigo; had I been asked, I would have signed it». The director Youssef Chahine, winner of the Palme d'Or, purchases the rights to the film shortly before his death. Meanwhile, the famous Hollywood director Mustafa Akkad said that one of his dreams was to adapt “Zakirat el Jassad” into a movie. Moved by his reading, President Ben Bella will say from his exile: «Ahlem is an Algerian sun that illuminates the Arab world». To date, more than one million copies have been sold across the Arabic-speaking world (excluding pirated editions which vastly outnumber the legal editions in the Arab world).  This novel also has the merit to reconcile the Arab reader with the Arabic language and reading.

The trilogy
Ahlem continues her literary career by giving two sequels to her novel: “Fawda el Hawas” (The Chaos of Senses) in 1997 and “Aber Sareer” (Bed Hopper) in 2003. Each part of the trilogy, now a classic, is a bestseller in its own right throughout the Arab world.
In 1998, Ahlem receives the Naguib Mahfouz literary prize for “Memory of the Flesh". This prize was founded by the American University of Cairo, which will translate the novel in English and publish it in 2000. The jury will say about the author: «Ahlem is a light which shines in thick darkness. She was able to get out of the linguistic exile in which French colonialism had relegated the Algerian intellectuals».
In 2010, "Nessyan.com" (The Art of Forgetting) is published. It is a break up manual for women, which will bring Ahlem closer to a female audience (Nessyan.com's humorous reference on the cover is that it is banned from sale to men). 
In 2012, Ahlem's latest novel, El Aswad Yalikou Biki (Black Suits You so Well) is published. The novel confirms Ahlem's status as a major Arab novelist. The story evokes the struggle of a young Algerian teacher whose father, a singer, is killed in the nineties by the terrorists who stand against any form of art and joy in society. Singing at her father's funeral, the girl, previously forbidden to speak to, carries away the crowd with her dreamy voice. Defying terrorism, she embarks in a singing career. She then has to flee her country and during her exile she meets a wealthy and mysterious man who tries to seduce her. The novel addresses the challenge of standing up not only to terrorism but also to the crushing power of money and the media.

Fights and influence
For over 35 years, Ahlem's contribution enriched the Arabic literary scene. Furthermore, through her writings she led the fight against corruption, injustice, totalitarian regimes, fundamentalism, new forms of colonization and the denigration of women's right. With deep admiration for an Algerian poet, Ahlam Mosteghanemi established the Malek Haddad Literary Prize in 2001 for the best Algerian writer. While interviewed in June 2001 she voiced her worries about the lack of Arabic literature in Algeria and was in hopes that the Malek Haddad Literary Prize would encourage more to write in Arabic. Just like Ahlam, Malek Haddad was also from Constantine, Algeria. Although he gave up writing, his reasoning was due to him not being allowed to write in Arabic. Ahlam Mosteghanemi quoted Hadda throughout "Memory in Flesh" and loved what he stood for. Her quotes, on love as well as politics, are widely used by the Arab public.

Works

Novels
 Zakirat el Jassad (Memory in the Flesh/The Bridges of Constantine) - Published by Dar al adab, Beirut, 1993, 34 printed editions. Considered by critics as a turning point in Arabic literature.
 Fawda el Hawas (Chaos of the Senses) - Published by Dar al adab in Beirut 1997, 30 printed editions.
 Aber Sareer (Bed Hopper) - Published by Dar al adab in Beirut 2003, 22 printed editions.
 El Aswad Yalikou Biki (Black Suits You so Well) - Published by Hachette-Antoine in Beirut 2012

Anthologies
 Ala Marfa al Ayam (In the Harbour of Days) - Published by SNED in Algers 1973.
 Al Kitaba fi Lahdat Ouray (Writing in a Moment of Nudity) - Published by Dar Al-Adab in Beirut 1976.
 Algérie, femmes et écriture (Algeria, Women and Writings) - Published by l'Harmattan in Paris 1985.
 Akadib Samaka (Lies of a Fish) - Published by l'ENAG in Algiers 1993.
 Nessyane.com (The Art of Forgetting)- Published by Dar Al-Adab in Beirut 2009.
 Shahiyyan ka firâq (Delicious as Parting Dreams)- Published by Hachette-Antoine/Naufal 2018.

Academic research
 Academic research for her doctoral thesis, Paris 1982, supervised by Jacques Berque.

UNESCO has printed all her work in Braille for blind readers.

Mosteghanemi's works in the curriculum
Ahlam Mosteghanemi's novels have been adopted in the curricula of several universities and high schools worldwide, and dozens of university theses and research papers have been based upon her work. The French Ministry of Education has used parts of Memory in the Flesh for the French baccalaureate tests in 2003 in 15 countries where students chose Arabic as a second language. Her work has been translated into several foreign languages by prestigious publishing houses, including pocket books in French and English.

She lectured and worked as a visiting professor in many universities around the world including: The American University of Beirut, 1995; University of Maryland, 1999; University of Sorbonne, 2002; Montpellier University, 2002; University of Lyon, 2003; Yale University, 2005; MIT Boston, 2005; University of Michigan, 2005.

Translations
Most of Ahlem's work has been published in English by Bloomsbury Publishing which includes:
 "Zakirat el Jassad" (Memory in the Flesh), published under the title "The Bridges of Constantine" in 2013.
 "Fawda el Hawas" (The Chaos of the Senses), published in 2015.
 "Aber Sareer" (Bed Hopper), published under the title "The Dust of Promises" in 2016.
 "Nessyan.com" (The Art of Forgetting), published in 2011.
The publishing house Albin Michel translated some of her work in French : "Zakirat El Jassad" (Mémoires de la chair) in 2002 and "Fawda el Hawas" (Le Chaos des sens) in 2006.

A study of translations of Zakirat al-Jassad from Arabic into French and into English has been done by Abbad Kouider, following the translation concepts of Lawrence Venuti.

Awards and honors 

 Identified by Forbes Magazine in 2006 as the most successful Arabic writer, having exceeded sales of 2,300,000 and one of the ten most influential women in the Arab world and the leading woman in literature.
 Awarded The Shield of Beirut by the Governor of Beirut in a special ceremony held at UNESCO Palace attended by 1500 people at the time her book “nessyane.com” was published in 2009.
 Received the Shield of Al Jimar Foundation for Arabic Creativity in Tripoli – Libya, 2007.
 Named the Algerian Cultural Personality of the year 2007 by Algerian News Magazine and the Algerian Press Club.
 Selected for three years in a row (2006, 2007 and 2008) as one of the 100 most powerful public figures in the Arab World by Arabian Business Magazine, ranking at number 58 in 2008.
 Named The Most Distinguished Arab Woman of 2006 (selected from 680 nominated women) by the Arab Women Studies Center Paris / Dubai
 Awarded a medal of honor from Abdelaziz Bouteflika the President of Algeria in 2006.
 Received the Medal of Appreciation and Gratitude from Sheikh Abdelhamid Ben Badis Foundation, Constantine, 2006.
 Received the Pioneers of Lebanon Committee Medal for her overall work 2004.
 Received the George Tarabeh Prize for Culture and Creativity, Lebanon, 1999.
 Received the Amman Loyalty Medal for Creativity, Amman, Jordan 1999.
 Received the Naguib Mahfouz Medal for Literature for Memory of the Flesh in 1998.
 Received the Nour Foundation Prize for Women's Creativity, Cairo, 19*6.
 Received the 2014 Best Arabic Writer award during the Beirut International Award Festival (BIAF).
 Received in London the Arab Woman of the Year Award 2015 in an event supported by the mayor of London and Regent's University London.
 Named UNESCO Artist for Peace by Irina Bokova, director of the organization, on the 16th of December 2016 in Paris.

See also 

 The Passenger Of a Bed
 Forgetting.com
 Black Suits You so Well

References 

 world's most Influential Arabs 2007 - Ahlam Mosteghanemi # 96
 world's most Influential Arabs 2008 - Ahlam MosteghanemiI # 58

External links
 Ahlam Mosteghanemi website
 Ahlam Mosteghanemi Arab author
 A Review of Memory And Desire by Ferial Ghazoul, Al-ahram Weekly

1953 births
Living people
Algerian writers
Writers from Tunis
Recipients of the Naguib Mahfouz Medal for Literature
University of Algiers alumni
University of Paris alumni
Algerian women writers
21st-century Algerian people